Herndon is an unincorporated community in Jenkins County, in the U.S. state of Georgia.

History
A post office called Herndon was established in 1858, and remained in operation until 1974. The community was named after William Lewis Herndon (1813–1857), United States Navy scientist, explorer, and hero.

References

Unincorporated communities in Jenkins County, Georgia
Unincorporated communities in Georgia (U.S. state)